Doel was a laptop assembled in Bangladesh as part of a circa 2011 national education program. It is assembled by Telephone Shilpa Sangstha. It was the first laptop made in Bangladesh. The OS used is Android or Microsoft Windows (e.g. XP Home, Vista Starter or Home Basic).

Logo Of Doel

The computer's name comes from the national bird of Bangladesh, the doel or Oriental magpie robin, a widely used symbol in Bangladesh.
In 2011, the eventual plan was to distribute Doel and other computers to every K-12 student in Bangladesh, along with free software (such as Edubuntu or Sugar) for education and open educational resources. Bangladesh had digitized an entire suite of textbooks in the Bengali language for free distribution.

In the event, the project faced technical and fund problems, and by 2016, was in limbo.

References

External links
 Doel laptop plant
 Walton Laptop plant

Linux-based devices
Personal computers
Computer-related introductions in 2011
Electronics industry in Bangladesh
Government of Bangladesh
Bangladeshi brands